Vacuolar protein sorting-associated protein 28 homolog is a protein that in humans is encoded by the VPS28 gene.

Function 

This gene encodes a protein involved in endosomal sorting  of cell surface receptors via a multivesicular body/late endosome pathway. The encoded protein is one of the three subunits of the ESCRT-I complex (endosomal complexes required for transport) involved in the sorting of ubiquitinated protein. The two other subunits of ESCRT-I are vacuolar protein sorting 23 (VPS23), also known as tumor susceptibility gene 101 (TSG101), and vacuolar protein sorting 37 (VPS37). Two alternative transcripts encoding different isoforms have been described. Additional alternative transcripts may exist but the proteins encoded by these transcripts have not been verified experimentally.

Interactions 

VPS28 has been shown to interact with TSG101.

References

Further reading